In London is a live album by American jazz saxophonist Dewey Redman featuring performances recorded in 1996 for the BBC and released on the Palmetto label.

Reception
The Allmusic review by Scott Yanow awarded the album 4 stars stating " Dewey Redman emerges as an underrated giant".

Track listing
All compositions by Dewey Redman except as indicated
 "I Should Care" (Sammy Cahn, Axel Stordahl, Paul Weston) - 10:55 
 "The Very Thought of You" (Ray Noble) - 9:28 
 "I-Pimp" - 1:45 
 "Portrait in Black and White" (Chico Buarque, Antonio Carlos Jobim) - 9:17 
 "Tu-Inns" - 7:18 
 "Kleerwine" - 4:12 
 "Stablemates" (Benny Golson) - 5:21 
 "Eleven" - 8:58
Recorded Ronnie Scott's Jazz Club in London in October 1996

Personnel
Dewey Redman - tenor saxophone
Rita Marcotulli - piano
Cameron Brown - bass
Matt Wilson - drums

References

Palmetto Records albums
Dewey Redman albums
1996 live albums